Ophichthus vietnamensis is an eel in the family Ophichthidae (worm/snake eels). 
It is found on the central Vietnamese coast.

References

vietnamensis
Fish of Vietnam
Taxa named by Vn Quang Vo
Taxa named by Yosuke Hibino
Taxa named by Hans Hsuan-Ching Ho
Fish described in 2019